Ongoujou (population 11,500) is a town located on the island of Anjouan in the Comoros.

Populated places in Anjouan